Auguste Marc Alphonse Georges Grisier (2 February 1853 – 5 June 1909) was a French playwright and journalist.

He collaborated to numerous newspapers such as Le Figaro, Paris-Journal, Le Peuple français, La Patrie, La France or L’Écho de France and was managing director of the Théâtre des Bouffes-Parisiens in 1895.

His plays were performed, inter alia at the Théâtre de la Porte-Saint-Martin and the Théâtre de l'Ambigu.

Works 
1884 : Le Bouquet de violettes, opéra comique in one act, with Maxime Boucheron
1885 : Pêle-mêle gazette, revue in 4 acts and 7 tableaux, with Blondeau and Monréal
1886 : Paris en général, revue, with Henri Blondeau and Hector Monréal
1886 : Le Petit Canuchon, vaudeville in 4 acts, with Monréal
1888 : Roger la honte, drama in 5 acts and 8 tableaux, with Jules Mary
1890 : Le Régiment, drama in 5 acts and 8 tableaux, with Mary
1890 : Prix de Beauté, comedy-ballet in 3 acts, with Edmond Rostand
1892 : Maître d'Armes, drama in 5 acts and 9 tableaux, with Mary
1895 : Au clair de la lune, revue, with Blondeau and Monréal

Bibliography 
 Henri Avenel, La presse française au vingtième siècle, 1901, (p. 271)
 Florian Bruyas, Histoire de l'opérette en France, 1855-1965, 1974, (p. 285)
 Éloges funèbres des sociétaires décédés. Bulletin de l'Association des journalistes parisiens, 10 April 1910, (pp. 29-31), .

19th-century French journalists
French male journalists
19th-century French dramatists and playwrights
Writers from Paris
1855 births
1909 deaths
19th-century French male writers